Sheyvand is a village in the general area areas of the Mongasht & Shalu Protected Area near dezpart in Khuzestan Province, Iran. The area is purported to include a Safavid era inn (Abassi Inn), a tomb, dungeon, and Bardegary inscriptions.

References

External links

Populated places in Khuzestan Province